Bjarne Larsen (26 July 1904 – 12 April 1972) was a Norwegian footballer. He played in one match for the Norway national football team in 1931.

References

External links
 

1904 births
1972 deaths
Norwegian footballers
Norway international footballers
Place of birth missing
Association footballers not categorized by position